I Love Your Work is an American psychological thriller film completed in 2003 and released theatrically in 2005. The film was directed by Adam Goldberg and written by Goldberg and Adrian Butchart. An indictment of celebrity culture, it was not a commercial success. The cast includes Giovanni Ribisi, Christina Ricci, and Vince Vaughn. The movie premiered on September 5, 2003 at the Toronto International Film Festival.

The DVD was distributed by THINKFilm on March 28, 2006.

Plot summary
Gray Evans, a movie star, is losing his grip on reality, unable to adjust to his own celebrity, and addicted to romantic fantasies about idealistic love and his once simple life. With his celebrity marriage to the beautiful actress Mia already strained by jealousy and frustration after only a year together, Gray is looking for escape. An avid photographer, his voyeuristic nature leads him to a local video store, where an encounter with the video clerk's wife Jane leads to a dangerous obsession over what he imagines to be an ideal love. Gray falls further over the edge, as his conceptions of love and reality are further blurred by the similarities between Jane and his ex-girlfriend Shana to the point where obsession becomes delusion. Gray's life is further complicated by the realities of his own celebrity, an obsessive fan and the need for him to create his public persona as a successful man with a successful marriage. Profession, obsession, and delusion twist together beyond repair when Gray pulls the video clerk, an ambitious screenwriter, into his world by offering to make a movie with him. Their relationship succeeds in bringing him closer to Jane but takes away any last hold on reality, as his fantasy leads to destruction. The layered narrative swings around on itself, taking us on a journey through love, madness and paranoia all the while holding on to a darkly comic view of its own absurd world of crazy Russian bodyguards, loyal assistants, playboy producers and true celebrity.

Cast
Giovanni Ribisi – Gray Evans
Franka Potente – Mia
Joshua Jackson – John Everhart
Marisa Coughlan – Jane Styros
Christina Ricci – Shana
Jason Lee – Larry Hortense
Rick Hoffman – Gray's Attorney
Vince Vaughn – Stiev
Shalom Harlow – Charlotte
Jared Harris – Jehud
Lake Bell – Felicia
Elvis Costello – Himself
Haylie Duff – Fan

Reception
Rotten Tomatoes gives the film a 23% rating from 31 critics.

References

External links

The Four Temperaments

2003 films
American nonlinear narrative films
2000s English-language films
2000s American films